The 2004 Hart Council election took place on 10 June 2004 to elect members of Hart District Council in Hampshire, England. One third of the council was up for election and the Conservative Party stayed in overall control of the council.

After the election, the composition of the council was:
Conservative 18
Liberal Democrat 12
Independent 3
Community Campaign (Hart) 2

Campaign
In early May 2004 the Conservative leader of the council, Lorraine Fullbrook, resigned as a councillor in order to stand for the seat of South Ribble in the 2005 general election. This meant an extra seat in Church Crookham West would be contested in the local elections.

The election saw the Conservatives challenged by a new Community Campaign (Hart) group as well as from the main political parties. The group had been formed in 2003 in protest against plans to develop a barracks in Church Crookham.

Election result
The results saw the Conservatives stay in control of the council despite losing 2 seats to the new Community Campaign (Hart) group and 1 seat to the Liberal Democrats. Community Campaign (Hart) gained the seats of Church Crookham East and West and came second in two additional wards. Meanwhile, the Liberal Democrats gained Fleet Courtmoor from the Conservatives, while holding the other 4 seats they had been defending. However the Conservatives did manage to gain one seat in Crondall, where they defeated Brian Leversha who had resigned from the Conservatives to sit as an Independent.

Meanwhile, no Independents were successful in being elected with former councillor Peter Carr coming closest after losing by 66 votes. The other candidates from the Labour Party, British National Party and Official Monster Raving Loony Party each failed to get more than 200 votes.

Ward results

Blackwater and Hawley

Church Crookham East

Church Crookham West

Crondall

Fleet Central

Fleet Courtmoor

Fleet Pondtail

Fleet West

Hook

Odiham

Yateley East

Yateley West

References

2004
2004 English local elections
2000s in Hampshire